Tribasodites cehengensis is a species of beetle first found in Guizhou, China.

References

Staphylinidae
Insects of China
Beetles described in 2015